John Keane is an American record producer based in Athens, Georgia, who has worked extensively with R.E.M., Indigo Girls and Widespread Panic. He owns and operates John Keane Studios in Athens, which opened in 1981.  

Keane has participated in many music conference panels as an expert on subjects such as record production, home recording, and Pro Tools. These include South by Southwest in Austin, The Tape Op conference in Portland OR, Athfest in Athens, GA, and the Cutting Edge in New Orleans. He has taught a Pro Tools course for the University of Georgia’s Music Business Program, and is the author of the popular Pro Tools book, The Musician’s Guide to Pro Tools (McGraw-Hill). He has also created Online Pro Tools, a series of Pro Tools instructional videos.

He started in 1981 with an assortment of road-worn PA gear that belonged to Phil and the Blanks, a local band he was playing with at the time. He bought a TEAC reel-to-reel 4-track tape machine which he mounted in a shopping cart and started making demos for local bands and taking them to the local college radio station for airplay.

Gradually the hobby evolved into a profession, and in 1985 Keane decided to attend The Recording Workshop in Chillicothe, Ohio. Shortly after that he bought an Amek Matchless console and an Otari 16-track tape machine and began to produce records for acts in the burgeoning Athens music scene such as the Indigo Girls, Widespread Panic, Vic Chesnutt, The Barbecue Killers and many others. His neighbor Peter Buck of R.E.M. began to bring many artists into the studio for collaboration, such as Warren Zevon, Robyn Hitchcock, Nicki Sudden, Billy Bragg, The Troggs, Richard Butler, and Nancy Griffith, to name a few. The other members or R.E.M.; Mike Mills, Michael Stipe, and Bill Berry all brought bands into the studio to make records.

By the early 90s John Keane Studios had upgraded to an Otari 24-track, a Pro Tools rig and a Trident 80-B console.

His studio is still going strong today, with recent recording projects by R.E.M., Randall Bramblett, and Widespread Panic's Dirty Side Down album, for which he received a Grammy nomination in 2011.

Keane began playing guitar at age 8 and developed an interest in recording music after receiving a cassette recorder on his 12th birthday. In a 2005 interview he recalled: "Later I got another one and figured out how to overdub by bouncing tracks from one machine to the other while playing along. I'd do stuff like play both lead guitar parts to Allman Brothers songs, and layer vocal harmonies. When I got a four-track, I thought I'd died and gone to heaven."

Record production discography

Musician discography

References

Year of birth missing (living people)
Place of birth missing (living people)
Living people
Record producers from Georgia (U.S. state)
People from Athens, Georgia
The Minus 5 members
R.E.M. personnel